Ralph Remington (born January 2, 1963 in Philadelphia, Pennsylvania) is a multidisciplinary artistic leader and community builder, theater director, essayist, actor, writer, and former American politician. Ralph was appointed by Mayor London Breed as Director of Cultural Affairs for the San Francisco Arts Commission and the City and County of San Francisco in January 2021. Ralph is the former Deputy Director for Arts and Culture for the City of Tempe, Arizona. He also had artistic responsibility for the Tempe Center for the Arts as artistic director.  Remington is the former Western Regional Director/Assistant Executive Director of Actors' Equity Association. In 2010 he became the Director of Theater and Musical Theater for the National Endowment for the Arts. He currently resides in San Francisco, California. Remington has written seven feature screenplays and two plays.

He is founding producing artistic director of Pillsbury House Theatre, in Minneapolis Minnesota where he was also an elected member of the Minneapolis City Council. He served one term from 2006 through 2010. Ralph Remington is a US Army Veteran, certified AIDS/HIV educator, union member and former International Brotherhood of Teamsters organizer. He is currently a member of Screen Actors Guild and American Federation of Television and Radio Artists (SAG-AFTRA) and Actors' Equity Association (AEA).

Early life
Ralph grew up in West Philadelphia. His parents are Ralph and Sadie Satterthwaite. He has two younger siblings Eric and Kristoffer Satterthwaite. He attended Anderson Elementary School, Julia R. Masterman School and Turner Middle School. He was also a student at Central High School (Philadelphia) before leaving in his second year for The Philadelphia High School for the Creative and Performing Arts. Ralph Remington is a member of the first graduating class of The Philadelphia High School for the Creative and Performing Arts, in 1980, where he was President of the Student Council for two years. He was a Drama Major and a Dance Minor. He studied Ballet, Tap, Jazz and Modern at Philadanco. While in high school, Ralph was a TV moderator/host for the series Perspective Youth on the ABC-TV affiliate WPVI-TV in Philadelphia. Ralph changed his name professionally from Satterthwaite to Remington upon joining the acting unions in the 1980s. His first acting gig under an Equity contract was Soulful Scream of a Chosen Son with Rob Morrow, written by Ned Eisenberg, at The Philadelphia Festival Theater for New Plays. While living in New York City, he was a member of the company Thunder in the Light, under the direction of Remi Bosseau at The Whole Theatre, under artistic director Olympia Dukakis.

Career

Remington is currently Director of Cultural Affairs for the San Francisco Arts Commission. He is the former Deputy Director of Arts and Culture for the City of Tempe, AZ. In that capacity he functioned as Artistic Director for the Tempe Center for the Arts. Remington served as the Western Regional Director/Assistant Executive Director of Actors' Equity Association (AEA). The labor union represents 50,000 Actors and Stage Managers of the professional theatre in the United States.

Remington served as the Director for Theater and Musical Theater at the National Endowment for the Arts. He was responsible for the grantmaking processes for theater and musical theater, developing partnerships to advance the theater field as a whole, and leading large-scale theater projects such as the NEA's New Play Development Program. He was appointed by NEA chairman and Broadway theatre producer, Rocco Landesman.

In January 2014, Remington become the western regional director for Actors' Equity Association, the union of professional actors.

Remington has directed, produced and acted in over 50 plays. He served as artistic associate and director of community engagement with Arena Stage, overseeing all of the company's outreach and education programs and a staff of 19, managing a $750,000 budget. While at Arena, he led the Living Stage Theater Company, created and toured a devised work piece called America: Work in Progress, and directed Dael Orlandersmith's critically acclaimed The Gimmick and Talking With by Jane Martin.

In the spring of 2002, Remington directed a production of Amiri Baraka's Dutchman at the Source Theater in Washington.

He was the executive director of the Media Artists Resource Center in St. Paul where he was responsible for fundraising and strategic planning and engineered a successful merger with the Independent Filmmaker Project.

Remington founded Pillsbury House Theatre out of the settlement house tradition of community collaboration. He served as Pillsbury's producing artistic director, managing a $500,000 budget. He also selected and oversaw a four-to-six play annual series; founded Breaking Ice, a touring multiracial, socio-political improv company for youth and adults; and created the Chicago Avenue Project where children write and perform original plays with professional actors. The program received a Coming Up Taller award in 2005. Presented by the First Lady Laura Bush on behalf of the President's Committee on the Arts and Humanities, Coming Up Taller awards recognize outstanding community arts and humanities programs that celebrate the creativity of America's young people. In addition, Remington has directed at Intermedia Arts, Painted Bride Art Center, The Southern Theater and Walker Art Center.

Remington is also a former member of the Guthrie Theater acting company, in Minneapolis, Minnesota with Rainn Wilson in The Venetian Twins.

Remington ran to represent Minneapolis's Ward 10 on the Minneapolis City Council, defeating Scott Persons 55%–45% in the 2005 election to replace retiring incumbent Dan Niziolek. Remington's term began January 2, 2006. He did not run for reelection in 2009 and was succeeded by Meg Tuthill at the end of his term on January 4, 2010.
 
He received his Bachelor of Fine Arts degree in Drama from Howard University.

National Endowment for the Arts

He was responsible for designing and leading national leadership initiatives, developing partnerships to advance the theater field, recommending panelists, and managing the review process for theater and musical theatre applications. Remington implemented stronger emphasis on new play development with 75% of NEA funding focused on new plays. Under his leadership fewer grants were awarded at greater financial amounts resulting in higher institutional impact. He makes frequent speeches and public dialogues to national audiences at various venues around the country.
Remington has forged stronger relationships with private and public funders nationally.
In December 2011 Remington was invited by the Chinese Minister of Culture to be a Keynote Speaker at The 2nd International Forum on the Development of China's Musical Theatre & The 5th Symposium on the Teaching & Creation of China's Musical Theatre, at the Beijing Contemporary Music Academy. He specifically addressed the funding and development of Musical Theatre by the United States of America.

Pillsbury House Theatre

 Yacub: Mad Scientist or Genius? by Homer Jackson director Ralph Remington (1992)
 Statements After an Arrest Under the Immorality Act by Athol Fugard director Ralph Remington (1992)
 Gerry Girouard Dancers in The Shadows of the Diamond Realm  (1992)
 Danny and the Deep Blue Sea by John Patrick Shanley director Ralph Remington (1993)
 Slow Dance on the Killing Ground by William Hanley director Ralph Remington (1993)
 Power Tools by Xavier Leonard director Ralph Remington (1993)
 The Taking of Miss Janie by Ed Bullins director Ralph Remington (1993)
 Azande in Les Mannequins by Azande director Azande (1993)
 The Colors of Desire by Alexs Pate and David Mura director Ralph Remington (1994)
 Savage in Limbo by John Patrick Shanley director Ralph Remington (1994)
 Thoughts from a Cultural Revolutionary by Ralph Remington director Ralph Remington (1994)
 Combination Skin by Lisa Jones director Dawn Renee Jones (1994)
 MultiCultiBoho Sideshow by Alexs Pate director Ralph Remington (1994)
 This City of Dreams by Walter Allen Bennett, Jr. director Ralph Remington (1995)
 The Hittite Empire in Undersiege Stories by the Hittite Empire (1995)
 The Punic Wars by Sirius B (1995)
 Extremities by William Mastrosimone director Ralph Remington (1996)
 Sexual Perversity in Chicago by David Mamet director Dwight Callaway (1996)
 Bring the Children Home by Marci Rendon directors Noel Raymond & Heidi Hunter Batz (1996)
 Streamers by David Rabe director Noel Raymond (1997)
 Women of Manhattan by John Patrick Shanley director Ralph Remington (1997)
 The Brunette Breck Girl by Heidi Arnesan director Heidi Arnesan (1997)
 Burn This by Lanford Wilson director Ralph Remington (1997)
 The Sign in Sidney Brustein's Window by Lorraine Hansberry directors Dwight Callaway & Ralph Remington (1998)
 Where I'm At conceived, developed and directed by Heidi Hunter Batz (1998)
 Dutchman by LeRoi Jones director Brian Goranson (1998)
 A Streetcar Named Desire by Tennessee Williams director Leah C. Gardiner (1999)
 Shelter (staged reading) by Dwight Hobbes director Ralph Remington (1999)

Minneapolis City Council

Neighborhoods in Ward 10

•     CARAG: Calhoun Area Residents Action Group
•     CIDNA: Cedar Isles Dean Neighborhood Association
•     ECCO: East Calhoun Community Organization
•     EIRA: East Isles Residents Association
•     EHFNA: East Harriet Farmstead Neighborhood Association
•     LHENA: Lowry Hill East Neighborhood Association
•     LNA: Lyndale Neighborhoon Association

Major Developments or Initiatives in Ward 10

•       Acme Tag
•	Blue Apartments 
•	Calhoun Square Redevelopment 
•	Lake Calhoun City Apartments
•	Lumen on Lagoon 
•	Midtown Greenway 
•	Mozaic 
•	Uptown House 
•	Uptown Small Area Plan
•	Urban Village

Appointments
Committees

•	Community Development 
•	Elections 
•	Intergovernmental Relations 
•	Rules, chair 
•	Taxes 
•	Zoning and Planning

Boards, Commissions and Task Forces

•	Meet Minneapolis 
•	Southwest Corridor Policy Advisory Committee 
•	Urban Land Institute Executive Committee 
•	National League of Cities Public Safety Committee 
•	MTN Study Commission 
•	Republican National Convention Workgroup 
•	Civilian Review Authority Workgroup 
•	Minneapolis Community Development Agency (MCDA) Operating Committee 
•	Midtown Community Works

Speeches, Articles and Resolutions

•	Animal Protection Article 
•	A Premier Destination Speech 
•	Closing Speech on Circus Animals 
•	Circus Animal Ban Speech 
•	Destroying Tribalism and Creating Community 
•	Final Cessation of War Resolution 
•	Impeachment Now 
•	The City Can and Should Prohibit Animal Circuses

Political Unsupported Claims

Ralph Remington was an early supporter and a Minnesota statewide elected delegate for the nomination of then Senator Barack Obama for President of the United States at The Democratic National Convention in Denver, Colorado in 2008. As a city council member in Minneapolis, he was one of the earliest elected officials in the country, along with Minneapolis Mayor R.T. Rybak to support Barack Obama for his first Presidential bid. Remington was the first African-American and indeed the first person of color ever elected to represent his ward on the Minneapolis City Council.

Awards
2002 Distinguished Alumni Award from Howard University

2010 NEA chairman's Award for Distinguished Service

Military service
After receiving his Bachelor of Fine Arts degree from Howard University, Remington enlisted in the US Army. He completed Basic Training at Fort Jackson. He was then sent to Communications School at Fort Gordon, in Augusta, Georgia. After graduation from Fort Gordon he received orders to report to McNair Kaserne 32nd Signal Battalion in Frankfurt, Germany in 1985. He was stationed in V Corps under the command of General Colin Powell. He lived in Frankfurt, Germany for two and a half years. He received an Honorable Discharge in 1988.

Personal life
Ralph was married to German designer Andrea Moseler in 1988. They divorced in 1991. Ralph has been with current spouse Mary Remington since 2000. He has two step-daughters, Bridget and Brianna. Remington has also lived in New York City, Santa Monica, California and Culver City, California as an actor and screenwriter.

References
 Speeches and Publications, Minneapolis City Council (archived)

External links
http://www.nea.gov/news/news10/Ralph-Remington-NEA-appointment.html/ National Endowment for the Arts Announces 
Ralph Remington as the New Director of Theater 
and Musical Theater

1963 births
Living people
Minneapolis City Council members
Minnesota Democrats
Businesspeople from Philadelphia
Politicians from Philadelphia
Military personnel from Philadelphia